A common year is a calendar year with 365 days, as distinguished from a leap year, which has 366.  More generally, a common year is one without intercalation.  The Gregorian calendar (like the earlier Julian calendar) employs both common years and leap years to keep the calendar aligned with the tropical year, which does not contain an exact number of days.

The common year of 365 days has 52 weeks and one day, hence a common year always begins and ends on the same day of the week (for example, January 1 fell on a Sunday and December 31 will fall on a Sunday in 2023, the current year) and the year following a common year will start on the subsequent day of the week. In common years, February has exactly four weeks, so March begins on the same day of the week. November also begins on this day.  For example, February 2023 started on a Wednesday, so March started on a Wednesday as well.  November follows the same characteristic.

Each common year has 179 even-numbered days and 186 odd-numbered days.

In the Gregorian calendar, 303 of every 400 years are common years. By comparison, in the Julian calendar, 300 out of every 400 years are common years, and in the Revised Julian calendar (used by Greece) 682 out of every 900 years are common years.

Calendars
 Common year starting on Monday
 Common year starting on Tuesday
 Common year starting on Wednesday
 Common year starting on Thursday
 Common year starting on Friday
 Common year starting on Saturday
 Common year starting on Sunday

Calendars
Types of year
Units of time